Gernot Messner (born 10 October 1980) is an Austrian football manager and a former player. He is the manager of Grazer AK.

Austrian footballers
1980 births
Living people
SV Spittal players
SK Rapid Wien players
FC Red Bull Salzburg players
FC Kärnten players
Wolfsberger AC players
Austrian Football Bundesliga players
2. Liga (Austria) players
Association football midfielders
Austrian football managers
Grazer AK managers